Robert Lindstedt and Horia Tecău are the two times defending champions, but this year they decided not to participate.
Dustin Brown and Paul Hanley won the final by defeating 4th seeded Daniele Bracciali and Fabio Fognini 7–5, 6–3.

Seeds

Draw

Draw

References
 Main Draw

Doubles